Acantholipes germainae is a species of moth in the family Erebidae. It is found in Djibouti.

References

germainae
Moths described in 1991
Moths of Africa